Sossamon is a surname. Notable people with the surname include:

Len Sossamon (born 1950/51), American real estate developer, county administrator, and politician
Lou Sossamon (1921–2019), American football player
Shannyn Sossamon (born 1978), American actress, director and musician